Jimpressions may refer to:

Jim Meskimen's one man show.
Jim Sterling's online web show.